Miles to Go Before I Sleep is a quotation from the poem "Stopping by Woods on a Snowy Evening" by Robert Frost.

Miles to Go Before I Sleep may also refer to:

 Miles to Go Before I Sleep, a 1975 TV movie starring Martin Balsam
 "Miles to Go (Before I Sleep)", a 1998 single by Céline Dion

See also
 Miles to Go, 2009 memoir of Miley Cyrus
 "Miles to Go" (In Plain Sight episode)